The WES Feminist Comic Con is an annual event held by the Women Empowerment Society from Forman Christian College in Lahore, Pakistan. The two day event focuses on bringing together fans from around the country, with a focus on celebrating women, either as the characters or as the creators in comic books, films, and other forms of media. The WES Feminist Comic Con first took place on 2 November 2016, at Forman Christian College, and is scheduled to take place again on 17 and 18 November 2017.

History 
The WES Feminist Comic Con was first organised by the Women Empowerment Society at Forman Christian College in 2016. The event featured several events, including panels discussing comic books and feminism with writers, actors, and illustrators. In addition, the Comic Con featured several stalls, gaming opportunities, and events for fanart and cosplaying purposes. The event received support and was overall successful.

Locations

References 

Lahore
Comics conventions
Fan conventions
Women and comics